Finley General Hospital was a Union Army hospital which operated near Washington, D.C., during the Civil War. It operated from 1862 to 1865.

The hospital was set up with 1,061 beds. On December 17, 1864, 755 beds were occupied.

Location
The precise location of the hospital has been lost over time. However, several sources mention it and it is possible to deduct it from these pieces of information.

Walt Whitman mentions it in December 1862 in the Daily Morning Chronicles:

Gallaudet University was established on land donated by United States Postmaster General Amos Kendall and known as Kendall Green in 1856.

In The War Hospitals, John wells Bulkley writes in 1902:

A clarification is needed regarding the name of the streets:
Bladensburg Road is not the current Bladensburg Road (known at the time as Bladensburg Pike or Turnpike). It became known as the Old Bladensburg Road and sits were Delaware Avenue crossed Boundary Street.
 Boundary Street was renamed Florida Avenue on January 14, 1890.

Cantonment Sprague (also known as Camp Sprague), occupied by 1st Regiment R.I. Detached Militia was located next to Mrs. Joseph Gales's Mansion (her husband had passed away in 1860). The Eckington General Hospital opened in 1862 and closed in April 1863 when it merged with the adjacent Finley General Hospital.

The map below shows the direction to Glenmont Cemetery which still stands today along with "Bladensburg Road".

A confirmed illustration of Finley Hospital (lithography) from 1864 shows the Capitol Building and the Washington Monument.

See also

 Washington, D.C., in the American Civil War
 Medicine in the American Civil War
 Armory Square Hospital
 Lincoln Hospital
 Mount Pleasant General Hospital
 Harewood General Hospital
 Gallaudet University
 Joseph Gales

References

Finley Hospital
Military facilities in Washington, D.C.
Demolished buildings and structures in Washington, D.C.
Washington, D.C., in the American Civil War
Near Northeast (Washington, D.C.)
1862 establishments in Washington, D.C.
Defunct hospitals in Washington, D.C.
1865 disestablishments in Washington, D.C.